Rättvik Arena is an indoor bandy venue and event arena for music and culture in Rättvik, Dalarna County, Sweden, which officially opened on 13 June 2010 with performances by music artists like Kalle Moraeus and Ola Svensson. The arena was completed already by November 2009.

It was originally planned to be taken into use for the 2009/2010 season.

References

2010 establishments in Sweden
Bandy venues in Sweden
Buildings and structures in Dalarna County
Sport in Dalarna County
Sports venues completed in 2010